This is a list of the individuals who have played college football as a starting quarterback at the University of Maryland. The Maryland Terrapins have produced several prominent quarterbacks. Starting with three consecutive Atlantic Coast Conference (ACC) championships from 1983 to 1985, the program was sometimes referred to as "Quarterback U". Since then, Maryland quarterbacks Boomer Esiason, Frank Reich, Stan Gelbaugh, Neil O'Donnell, Scott Zolak, and Scott Milanovich have been considered part of that tradition.

Quarterbacks
Individuals who started at least one game in a season are denoted with their name in boldface text. Players are listed in order of game experience.

References

Maryland Terrapins

Maryland Terrapins starting quarterbacks